Double mini trampoline, sometimes referred to as double mini or DMT, is a Gymnastics discipline within trampolining. Participants perform acrobatic skills on an apparatus smaller than a regular competition trampoline. The apparatus has both an angled section and a flat section. Unlike individual trampoline, where scoring is predominantly determined by Execution, Time of Flight and Difficulty, the Difficulty in DMT plays a more prominent role in the final score.

A DMT routine or pass consist of two phases. The first phase is called a "mount"; during this phase the athlete jumps onto the angled part and flips off of it onto the flat part. The first phase can also be performed by jumping, without flips or twist, onto the flat part and then commencing the first flip or twist. In this case the first phase is called a "spotter". The second phase starts on the flat part and is called a "dismount"; the athlete lands the first flipping sequences from phase one and immediately launches into a second series of flips and twists before landing on a mat.

The athletes are judged on Difficulty and Execution. There are both Individual and Team competitions in the sport.

DMT is governed by the FIG, the International Federation of Gymnastics, and is included as an event within Trampoline Gymnastics. Although not an Olympic event yet, Elite DMT athletes compete at International level and can compete in various events organised by the FIG as well as at the World Games.

History 
DMT can be sourced back to 1970 when its inventors Robert F Bollinger and George Nissen combined two Mini trampolines with a small table and mat to cover in between. Later Robert F Bollinger combined the two Mini trampolines to create one 430 cm long Double Mini Trampoline and also designed the rules for competition and terms such as the mounter and spotter passes and he established its own difficulty system roughly based on the system used for diving. Robert F Bollinger was part of George Nissen's trampoline act and just as Nissen can be seen as the father of trampoline, Robert F Bollinger can be seen as the father of Double Mini Trampoline.
The first record of a Double mini competition comes from the Trampoline Gymnastics World Age Group Competitions in 1973 held in London, England. Athletes competing had little experience in the new apparatus and Robert F Bollinger jumped in and provided personal training on the Friday afternoon for the athletes wishing to compete the following day. Double mini was first introduced into the Trampoline World Championships, only six years after its invention, in the 1976, 9th Trampoline World Championships in Tulsa.

The DMT as we see it today is wider than the one Robert F Bollinger and George Nissen first created, and the change came mid 1990 when Horst Kunze, then President of the FIG Trampoline Technical Committee, asked Eurotramp Trampoline company if they could produce a DMT with a wider frame. This resulted in a wider DMT with a bed of 92 cm, which Horst Kunze states gave a real boost to the discipline. Since then this has been the international standard.

Skills 
Some common skills performed at international level competitions are: 
A Comprehensive list of skills can be found in FIG Code of Point Difficulty.

Full-In Full-Out 
Also known as Double-Twisting Double Back

A somersault commonly used as a dismount in which the athlete takes off traveling backwards and does a double somersault with a double twist, full twist in the first somersault and full twist in the second somersault. This skill can be performed ether tucked, piked or straight.

Triple Back Somersault 

A somersault commonly used as a dismount in which the athlete takes off traveling backwards and does a triple somersault. This skill can be performed either tucked, piked or, uncommonly, straight.

Miller 
Also known as Full in Double-Full Out or Triple-Twisting Double back

A somersault used as a dismount in which the athlete takes off traveling backwards and does a double somersault with a triple twist. This skill is named after world champion Wayne Miller (USA). This skill can be performed ether tucked, piked or straight.

Full-In Half-Out 
Also known as Full-Half, Full-In Barani-Out or Full-Barani

A somersault commonly used as a mount in which the athlete takes off traveling forwards and does a double somersault with a one and a half twist, full twist in the first somersault and half twist in the second somersault. This skill can be performed ether tucked, piked or straight.

Fliffis 
Also known as Half-Out

A somersault commonly used as a mount in which the athlete takes off traveling forwards and does a double somersault with a half twist, no twist in the first somersault and half twist in the second somersault. This skill can be performed ether tucked, piked or straight.

Triffis 
Also known as Half-out Triffis or 'TriffA somersault commonly used as a mount in which the athlete takes off traveling forwards and does a triple somersault with a half twist, no twist in the first two somersaults and a half twist in the third somersault. This skill can be performed either tucked or piked.

FIG Code of Point Difficulty
The difficulty in double mini is based upon a bonus system, where the number of rotation and twists are multiplied and then the position is added. The positions are tuck, pike and straight which are represented by "O" for Tuck, "<" for Pike and "/" for Straight

The FIG numeric system works as follows, first number is the amount of 1/4-rotations second number is the amount of 1/2-twist, the twists are divided into where in the skill they occur.

Example: Full-In Half-Out (8 2 1) has a total of 8 1/4-rotations corresponding to the first 8 then it has 2 1/2-twits in the first somersault corresponding to the 2 and 1 1/2-twits the second somersault corresponding to the 1'

FIG World Championship results

Men's Individual

Result are correct according to FIG's database as well as official records from the competition

Women's Individual

**Bianca Budler and Bianca Zoonekynd is the same person

Result are correct according to FIG's database as well as official records from the competition

References 

Trampolining
Gymnastics